George Newton Conrad (August 24, 1869 – January 21, 1937) was an American Democratic politician who served as a member of the Virginia Senate, representing the state's 8th district.

References

External links
 
 

1869 births
1937 deaths
University of Virginia alumni
Democratic Party Virginia state senators
People from Harrisonburg, Virginia
20th-century American politicians